{{safesubst:#invoke:RfD||2=Sacraments of the Living|month = March
|day =  6
|year = 2023
|time = 23:05
|timestamp = 20230306230500

|content=
REDIRECT Sacraments of the Catholic Church

}}